Tommaso Campailla (7 April 1668 – 7 February 1740) was an Italian philosopher, doctor, politician, poet and teacher.

Life 
Campailla was born in Modica in 1668 to the aristocratic family of Antonio and Adriana Giardina. When sixteen years old he studied law in Catania, later following self-study after returning to Modica. His further studies included those in literature, Cartesian philosophy, science, astronomy, and physics.

The effects of his own ill health led him to self-taught medical studies and self-healing practices and invented medical apparatus, particularly those with the use of mercury. He administered successfully as a physician in Modica, and taught other doctors, particularly in cures for syphilis, although these were often "considered outlandish and questionable" by his contemporaries.

As a writer, Campailla's most significant work, published 1709 and 1723, was the epic Cartesian-inspired poem The Adam, of twenty verses describing a simple uncorrupt man discovering and contemplating truth through the help of archangel Raphael. Editions of the poem were sold in various parts of Italy, and in England.
The poem was later dedicated to Charles VI, Holy Roman Emperor, and King of Sicily. The philosopher George Berkeley visited Modica and introduced Campailla to the works of Isaac Newton which afterwards became influential in Campailla's writings.

Campailla was a friend to Girolama Lorefice Grimaldi (1681-1762), a poet who wrote in 'Arcadian' style.

Tommaso Campailla married and had issue, was reluctantly elected a senator seven times, and refused professorships for London and Padua through reluctance to travel. He died of a stroke aged 72, on 7 February 1740, and his body interred near the altar of Modica's Cathedral of St George, with a plaque to his memory by the entrance.

The Museo Medico Tommaso Campailla, in Piazza Campailla, Modica, is named after Tommaso Campailla, and contains medical equipment he used, his anatomical theatre, his medical volumes, and more recent photographs of the stages of syphilitic progression. His former home in Modica is today a restaurant. A Modica High School & Technical Institute, the 'Liceo Galilei - Campailla Modica', is named after Tommaso Campailla and Galileo Galilei.

Works

References

Sources

1668 births
1740 deaths
People from Modica
17th-century Italian physicians
18th-century Italian physicians
Italian philosophers
Italian poets
Italian male poets
18th-century Italian male writers
17th-century Italian male writers
Politicians from the Province of Ragusa